Dejan Perić (born 22 September 1970) is a Serbian former handball player and current coach.

Club career
Over the course of his career that spanned almost three decades, Perić played for Pelister, Crvena zvezda (1991–1993), Atlético Madrid (1993–1994), Teucro (1994–1995), Celje (1995–2004 and 2011–2013), Barcelona (2004–2006) and MKB Veszprém (2006–2011). He won two consecutive EHF Champions League titles in the 2003–04 (with Celje) and 2004–05 (with Barcelona) seasons.

International career
At international level, Perić represented Serbia and Montenegro (known as FR Yugoslavia until 2003) in eight major tournaments, winning two bronze medals (1996 European Championship and 1999 World Championship). He also participated in the 2000 Summer Olympics.

Coaching career
While still a player, Perić served as an assistant to Sead Hasanefendić with the Serbia men's national handball team from 2009 to 2010. He independently led the team between 2014 and 2016, taking part in the 2016 European Championship.

Honours
Celje
 Slovenian First League: 1995–96, 1996–97, 1997–98, 1998–99, 1999–2000, 2000–01, 2002–03, 2003–04
 Slovenian Cup: 1995–96, 1996–97, 1997–98, 1998–99, 1999–2000, 2000–01, 2003–04, 2011–12, 2012–13
 EHF Champions League: 2003–04
Barcelona
 Liga ASOBAL: 2005–06
 EHF Champions League: 2004–05
MKB Veszprém
 Nemzeti Bajnokság I: 2007–08, 2008–09, 2009–10, 2010–11
 Magyar Kupa: 2006–07, 2008–09, 2009–10, 2010–11
 EHF Cup Winners' Cup: 2007–08

References

External links

 MKSZ record
 Olympic record
 
 

1970 births
Living people
People from Bečej
Serbian male handball players
Yugoslav male handball players
Competitors at the 1991 Mediterranean Games
Mediterranean Games medalists in handball
Mediterranean Games gold medalists for Yugoslavia
Olympic handball players of Yugoslavia
Handball players at the 2000 Summer Olympics
RK Crvena zvezda players
FC Barcelona Handbol players
Veszprém KC players
Liga ASOBAL players
Expatriate handball players
Serbia and Montenegro expatriate sportspeople in Spain
Serbia and Montenegro expatriate sportspeople in Slovenia
Serbian expatriate sportspeople in Hungary
Serbian expatriate sportspeople in Slovenia
Serbian handball coaches
Competitors at the 1990 Goodwill Games
Goodwill Games medalists in handball